Mszczuj of Skrzynno  (also Mściwoj  of Skrzynno; Polish: Mszczuj ze Skrzynna; died in 1446) was one of the Polish knights of Władysław Jagiełło who took part on July 15, 1410 in the Battle of Grunwald against the Teutonic Knights. He was a knight of the royal household regiment of the King of Poland (cubiculariorum). He bore a Łabędź, or Swan, as a coat of arms.

According to the Polish chronicler Jan Długosz, Mszczuj was part of the third Rota, a unit of cavalry of the royal household under the leadership of Andrzej Ciołek of Żelechowo and Jan Odrowąż of Sprowa. Długosz relates that Mszczuj was the knight who defeated and killed the Grand Master of the Order, Ulrich von Jungingen during the Battle of Grunwald. Długosz offers two pieces of evidence for this. First, Mszczuj's squire, Jurga, acquired and handed over a valuable reliquary with holy relics that had previously belonged to von Jungingen, as well as the Grand Master's battle cloak. Second, the locating of the Grand Master's body was made possible thanks to the directions given by Mszczuj, which indicates that the two knights definitely engaged each other on the field of battle.

On September 10, 1410, Mszczuj took part in a follow-up battle against the Teutonic Knights at Koronowo and contributed to the Polish-Lithuanian victory.

In 1412 he was part of the delegation and personal escort of Władysław Jagiełło to the Kingdom of Hungary, where he took part in tourneys and jousts. In 1428 he took part in the expedition against Great Novgorod carried out by the Grand Duke of Lithuania Vytautas. In 1431 he participated in Władysław Jagiełło's offensive against the rebel Švitrigaila in Lithuania and was present at the siege of Lutsk. A year later he led the reinforcements for the new Grand Duke Zygmunt Kiejstutowicz in his war against Švitrigaila.

He owned large tracts of land in Volodymyr. A 15th-century church, purportedly built by Mszczuj can be found and visited in Opoczno.

References

1446 deaths
Polish knights
15th-century Polish nobility
People in the Battle of Grunwald
Polish courtiers